Murchie is a surname. Notable people with the surname include:

 Guy Murchie (1907–1997), American artist, journalist, and aviator
 Harold H. Murchie (1888–1953), American politician and judge
 James Murchie (1813–1900), Canadian farmer, businessman and politician
 James Stafford Murchie (1850–1888), British trade unionist
 John Carl Murchie (1895–1966), Canadian soldier and Chief of the General Staff
 Peter Murchie (born 1986), English-born Scottish rugby player

See also 
 4642 Murchie, a main-belt asteroid